Jenmi is the term used to refer to the landed aristocracy of Kerala. They formed the landowning nobility as well as the landed gentry of the region during Medieval  times, and the majority of the estates and feudal properties were owned by this community. The Maharajas of Cochin and Travancore, as wells as many other rulers such as those of Punjar in Travancore and the Paliath Achans of Cochin, were well known for their numerous feudal estates. Temples like the Padmanabhaswamy Temple in Trivandrum (controlled by the Maharaja of Travancore), the Koodalmanikyam Temple (controlled by the Thachudaya Kaimal) and the Guruvayoor Temple of M. R. Ry. were built on lands owned by these feudal aristocrats. The Zamorins of Calicut were also Jenmis in their own right, owning at least 60,000 to 90,000 acres of estate lands.

Today, however, there are restrictions placed on the amount of land one can own in Kerala. A token pension is normally paid to Jenmis who have ceded their lands, but the Government has refused to do so from time to time.

Other major Jenmis included the Kurumathoor Namburidipad (5,615 acres) and the Kalliat Nambiar (36,779 acres).

Organised violence against Jenmis

There have been several incidences of violence against Jenmis, influenced by Communists.

Kayyur Incident:
Kayyur is a small village in Hosdurg taluk. In 1940, peasants there under the leadership of communists rose against the two local Jenmis, Nambiar of Kalliat and the Nayanar of Karakkatt Edam. Several people were killed in the conflict and four Communist leaders were found guilty and hanged by the government. A fifth instigator was sentenced to life imprisonment and was spared from the death penalty, since he was under the age of criminal liability.

Mattannur Incident:
Mattanur witnessed large scale communal riots between the Moplah tenants and their Nair landlords during 1852. The riots started when an armed band of 200 Moplahs entered the house of the local landlord, Kalathil Kesavan Thangal, and massacred his entire family of 18 members. The rioters then decided to eliminate the most powerful Jenmi in the district, Kalliat Anandan Nambiar. However, their plans were somehow leaked and the landlord fled with his family, leaving his nephew Kalliat Kammaran Nambiar to defend the land. Kammaran Nambiar organized a militia of 300 Nair warriors and waited for the rioters. The unsuspecting rioters were ambushed and massacred, and the tenants were forced to abandon their campaign and disband.

Korom Incident:
Another historic movement was at Korom village in Payyanur on 12 April 1948. Farmers from Payyanur Farka marched to the rice godown of the landlord, Aalakkat Mavila Kunhambu Nambiar, and took control of it and distributed the rice stored there among them. The Malabar Special Police force arrested the volunteers, including K P Kunhikkannan, the leader of the "Karshaka Sangham", upon the request of the landlord. To protest against these arrests, people marched to the spot where the volunteers were kept under police custody. The police started firing on the procession, and this resulted in the death of a harijan youth named Pokkan, who became the first martyr in Payyanur Farka during the 1948 movement.

See also
 Pulleri Illathu Madhusoodanan Thangal
 Kesava Pillai of Kandamath
 Mannarghat Nair

References

 Jenmi